Sougeal (Gallo: Sougéal; before 2022: Sougéal) is a commune in the Ille-et-Vilaine department in Brittany in northwestern France.

Population
Inhabitants of Sougeal are called Sougelais in French.

See also
Communes of the Ille-et-Vilaine department

References

External links

Mayors of Ille-et-Vilaine Association 

Communes of Ille-et-Vilaine